Thaddeus Michael "Mike" Findlay (born 19 October 1943 at Troumaca, Saint Vincent) is a former West Indian cricketer who played in ten Tests from 1969 to 1973 as a wicketkeeper.

When he toured Australia and New Zealand in 1968-69, Findlay became the first player from the Leeward and Windward Islands to represent the West Indies. (Alphonso Roberts came from St Vincent but was playing in Trinidad when he was selected for the West Indies team.) He also toured England in 1969 and 1976. Findlay says he found the experience and support of his teammates helpful when he entered the West Indies team: "I never forgot when I first went on tour with the West Indies team. An experienced player was given a younger player as his mentor. Wes Hall was a mentor to me. Jackie Hendriks was the No. 1 keeper, and Jackie would sit with me and pass on his experience."

Findlay played first-class cricket for the Windward Islands and the Combined Islands from 1965 to 1978. He captained both teams in most of their matches from 1970 to 1978.

After his career as a cricketer, Findlay became a journalist and commentated on matches. In 2002 he stepped down as Chairman of Selectors for the West Indies team. In 2007 he managed the West Indian team on its tour of England.

See also
List of West Indies Test wicket-keepers

References

External links
 

1943 births
Living people
West Indies Test cricketers
Combined Islands cricketers
Windward Islands cricketers
Saint Vincent and the Grenadines cricketers
People from Saint David Parish, Saint Vincent and the Grenadines
Wicket-keepers